QatarEnergy, formerly Qatar Petroleum (QP), is a state owned petroleum company of Qatar. The company operates all oil and gas activities in Qatar, including exploration, production, refining, transport, and storage. The President & CEO is Saad Sherida al-Kaabi, Minister of State for Energy Affairs. The company's operations are directly linked with state planning agencies, regulatory authorities, and policy making bodies. Together, revenues from oil and natural gas amount to 60% of the country's GDP.  it was the third largest oil company in the world by oil and gas reserves. In 2020, the company had total revenues of US$21bn, a net income of US$7.9bn, and total assets of US$116bn. In 2021, QatarEnergy was the fifth largest gas company in the world.

History

Establishment
After World War I and the collapse of the Ottoman Empire, Qatar fell within the British sphere of influence and the first onshore oil concession in the country was awarded in 1935 to British Petroleum's predecessor, the Anglo-Iranian Oil Company (AIOC). Because of its obligations under the Red Line Agreement, AIOC transferred the concession to an associate company of the Iraq Petroleum Co., Petroleum Development (Qatar) Ltd. (PDQ), which would operate the concession. PDQ was later renamed the Qatar Petroleum Co. (QPC). In October 1938, Dukhan No. 1 was spudded and yielded  by January 1940. However, World War II delayed development until 1947 and the first crude exports occurred in 1949.

The first offshore concessions were granted in 1949 to the International Marine Oil Company (IMOC), which was a subsidiary of Superior Oil and the London-registered Central Mining & Investment Co. In 1952, after IMOC had withdrawn, the Shell Co.-Qatar (SCQ) acquired exploration rights to most offshore territory. In 1960 and 1963, the Idd Al-Shargi and Maydan Mahzam fields were discovered, respectively. The largest offshore field, Bul Hanine, was discovered in 1970 and came onstream in 1972.

Worker strikes
Early strikes focused on wages and conditions, and the emir encouraged strikes when negotiating new contracts to pressure concessions from the oil company.

In August 1952, a coalition of workers presented their demands to Ahmad Al Thani, the son of emir Ali Al Thani. Their demands centered on improved working conditions, less foreigners in high-ranking positions, and increased wages. Ahmad rejected these demands, causing the workers to present their grievances to the British. But while considering the ongoing conditions in country's labour sector, the ILO issued new reports in November 2022, detailing the results of the Technical Cooperation Programme between the Government of Qatar and the ILO since it was launched in April 2018. The annual and four-year progress reports cover the substantial efforts that have been made in the areas of labour migration governance, the enforcement of the labour law and access to justice, and strengthening the voice of workers and social dialogue. These changes have already improved the working and living conditions for hundreds of thousands of workers, though additional efforts are needed to ensure that all workers can benefit.

Nationalization of oil sector
In 1973, the state seized a 25 percent stake in onshore concessions of QPC and offshore concessions of SCQ. As part of the agreement, the government stake would increase by 5 percent every year until it reached 51 percent in 1981. However, in early 1974, the initial agreement was repealed after QPC agreed to a new agreement which would allow the state to increase its share in both companies to 60 percent.

In December 1974, the government officially announced its intent to acquire SCQ's and QPC's remaining shares. A government decree passed in 1975 declared government ownership of the remaining shares. Negotiations throughout the following years resulted in the government assuming full ownership of QPC's onshore concessions in September 1976 and the SCQ's offshore activities in February 1977, thus fully nationalizing the oil sector.

In 1991, Qatar Petroleum initiated an upgrade program for oil production facilities. The program included bringing the Diyab structure (Dukhan) online and enhanced oil recovery (EOR), particularly at the Dukhan field. QP is carrying out similar work at several smaller fields, including the offshore Bul Hanine and Maydam Mahzam. Prospects for new discoveries are limited. QP carried out much exploration activity during the early 1980s but exploration declined as the oil glut of the mid-1980s gathered pace. Since then, QP has encouraged foreign operators to apply for exploration licenses. Although the number of wells drilled grew significantly towards the end of the 1980s, there was little success. Most new exploration and production (E&P) is done offshore by international oil companies, including ExxonMobil, Chevron, and Total. While substantial E&P is underway, there have not been any major oil discoveries in Qatar during the last decade. Most anticipated new oil production will come from Maersk Oil (Denmark), which operates the Al Shaheen field. Maersk reached an agreement with Qatar Petroleum in December 2005, under which the company intends to drill more than 160 production and water injection wells and establish three offshore platforms.

In August 2019, French multinational integrated oil and gas company Total confirmed signing deals over transferring some of its assets in Kenya, Guyana and Namibia to Qatar Petroleum. With the deals, QP will hold a 30% interest in Block 2913B and 28.33% in Block 2912 of Namibia. QP will also have 40% of the company holding Total’s existing 25% interests in the Orinduik and Kanuku blocks of Guyana and 25% interest in Blocks L11A, L11B and L12 of Kenya.

Qatarization

The company aims for its workforce to be composed of more than half of Qatari citizens by 2030. This policy is in line with the rest of the country in general and the government sector in particular. Currently the Qatarization level stands at around 30% and with one or two exceptions the top three management positions are occupied by male Qatari citizens. The company honours its employment contracts with Qatari citizens but frequently reneges on its obligations to its expat workforce during periods of low oil price.

Pipelines, exports and refineries
QP operates Qatar's oil pipeline network, which transports supplies from oil fields to the country's lone refinery and export terminals. QP operates an expansive offshore pipeline network that brings crude oil from offshore oil fields to Halul Island, where oil can be processed for export. Onshore, most oil is sent to Umm Said for refining or export. Qatar has three primary export terminals: Umm Said, Halul Island, and Ras Laffan. In the international market, the major customers are Emirates National Oil Co. (ENOC), Glencore, Bakri Trading, Vitol, Mitsui and ITOCHU.

Refining is carried out by two refineries - QP Refinery in Umm Said and Laffan Refinery in Ras Laffan. Besides Qatar Petroleum has two joint ventures with South African Sasol (Oryx GTL) and Anglo-Dutch Shell (Pearl GTL) which are producing synthetic petroleum products (GTL-naphtha, GTL-diesel) from natural gas using Gas-to-Liquids technology.

Qatar's first refinery was built in Umm Said in 1953. The first revamp of the Refinery was completed in 1974. By the early 1980s, growth in local consumption was such that Qatar began importing refined products. In 1983, a  refinery came online at Umm Said.

Laffan Refinery (RL1) came on-stream in September 2009.

Marketing and commercial aspects for the export of the Refined Products are entirely controlled by the Marketing Directorate of Qatar Petroleum (Tasweeq). In January 2020, Qatar Petroleum signed a 15-year agreement with Kuwait to supply 3 million tonnes of liquefied natural gas (LNG) per year.

On 6 February 2023, Qatar Petroleum (QP), the world's top LNG supplier, signed a contract for the first phase of its North Field LNG project expansion, aiming to boost the country's LNG output by 40% a year by 2026. Making this project one of the industry's largest investments with $28.7 billion. Qatar Petroleum is ready to develop the North Field alone, but a bidding process for international oil firms to take up to a 30% stake in the project's first phase will start next week. While second phase, known as the North Field South project, is expected to lift Qatar's LNG production capacity further to 126 mtpa by 2027.

Dolphin Project

Qatar Petroleum is part of the Dolphin Gas Project, which connects the natural gas networks of Oman, the United Arab Emirates, and Qatar with the first cross-border natural gas pipeline in the Persian Gulf region. The project is being developed by Dolphin Energy, a consortium owned by Mubadala Development on behalf of the Abu Dhabi government (51 percent), Total (24.5 percent), and Occidental Petroleum (24.5 percent). The Dolphin Project made significant progress in 2006. Construction was completed on all the project's upstream and downstream components by year-end except the gas processing plant located at Ras Laffan. A company spokesperson announced in March 2007 that it tested receiving and distribution facilities in the UAE, and expected to begin operations in June 2007.

Gas-to-liquids

GTL projects received significant attention in Qatar the last several years, and Qatar's government originally set a target of developing  of capacity by 2012. However, cancellations and delays substantially lowered this. In February 2007, ExxonMobil canceled its Palm GTL project, which was slated to produce . The Oryx GTL plant is a joint venture of QP and Sasol-Chevron GTL, and has a  capacity. The plant was commissioned in June 2006, but technical problems prevented the consortium from loading the first export until April 2007. In February 2007, Royal Dutch Shell held a groundbreaking ceremony for its Pearl GTL Project. The Pearl plant will be 51 percent-owned by QP, though Shell will operate the project with a 49 percent stake. The facility is expected to use natural gas feedstock to produce  of GTL products. The project will be developed in phases, with  capacity expected by 2010 and a second phase expected in 2011. The Pearl project will be the first integrated GTL operation in the world, meaning it will have upstream production integrated with the onshore conversion plant.

Subsidiaries

Qatar Petrochemical Co.
Qatar was the first Persian Gulf state to build its own petrochemical industry. The Qatar Petrochemical Co. (QAPCO) was established on 9 November 1974, by Emiri Decree No. 109, as a joint venture between QP (84 percent) and CdF (Chimie de France) and began production of ethylene, low-density polyethylene, and sulfur in 1981. In August 1990, QP's interest in QAPCO was reduced to 80 percent, with the remaining 20 percent split equally between Enimont (Italy), and Elf Aquitaine (France) through its Atochem subsidiary. The importance of reliable gas supplies was demonstrated in the early years of QAPCO, which were marred by shortages of ethane feedstock arising from fluctuations of associated gas production along with movements of oil prices. QAPCO's facilities consist of an ethylene plant producing 840,000 metric tons per annum (MTPA), three low-density polyethylene (LDPE) plants with 780,000 MTPA and a sulphur plant with 70,000 MTPA. Current shareholders are Industries Qatar (80 percent) and TotalEnergies (20 percent).

Qatar Fertiliser Co.
The Qatar Fertiliser Co. (QAFCO) was founded in 1969 as a joint venture between the Qatari government, Norsk Hydro Norway, Davy Power and Hambros Bank, to produce ammonia and urea. The company is now owned by Industries Qatar (75 percent) and Yara International (25 percent). QAFCO inaugurated its first plant in 1973 with a design daily capacity of 900 tons of ammonia and 1000 tons of urea. The QAFCO complex in Mesaieed City comprises four completely integrated trains; each train is made up of two units, one for production of ammonia and the other for urea, besides a urea formaldehyde unit. QAFCO total annual production capacity now is 2.0 MMT of ammonia and 2.8 MMT of urea, making QAFCO the world's largest single site producer of urea. A new plant expansion was scheduled to be completed in early 2011 (QAFCO 5), using Snamprogetti and Haldor Topsoe design. The increase in ammonia production will be 4600 metric ton/day.

Qatar Chemical Co.
The Qatar Chemical Co. (Q-Chem) is a Qatari company owned by Mesaieed Holding Company Company(MPHC) 49 percent, Chevron Phillips Chemical International Qatar Holdings LLC (Chevron Phillips Chemical Qatar) 49 percent, and Qatar Petroleum (QP) 2 percent.
MPHC is majority owned by QP. The Q-Chem facility is a world-class integrated petrochemical plant capable of producing high-density polyethylene (HDPE) and medium-density polyethylene (MDPE), 1-hexene, and other products. Over US $1 billion was invested to engineer, construct, and commission the Q-Chem facility, which began operations in late 2002. The Q-Chem complex in Mesaieed Industrial City comprises an ethylene unit (capable of producing 500,000 metric tons per annum (mtpa)), a polyethylene facility (capable of 453,000 mtpa), and a 1-hexene unit (capable of 47,000 mtpa). Q-Chem assets also include a sulfur recovery and solidification unit, a bagging and storage warehouse, a nitrogen unit, a water treatment plant, seawater cooling system, dock facilities and various administrative buildings.

Qatar Vinyl Co. (QVC)
Qatar Vinyl Company was established in 1997 and is located in Mesaieed Industrial City approximately 40 km South of Doha. The location of the plant is advantageous in terms of land, infrastructure, general utilities, safety, security and telecommunication. The plant has access to port infrastructure with sufficient capacity to accommodate vessels up to 55,000 tonnes for the import of salt and export of caustic soda, EDC and VCM.

The facilities were constructed by a consortium of Krupp Uhde GmBH and Technip Italy on a lump sum turnkey basis.

Project completion was achieved approximately 30 months after signing of the EPC Contract, with start up of the facilities taking place during the second quarter of 2001. The initial workforce numbered around 180 employees.
Qatar Vinyl Co. (QVC) shareholders are Mesaieed Petrochemical Holding Company (55.2 percent), QAPCO (31.9 percent) and QatarEnergy (12.9 percent).

Other subsidiaries
 Qatar Liquefied Gas Co. Ltd. (Qatargas; other shareholders are ExxonMobil, Total, Mitsui, Marubeni)
 RasGas Companies (70 percent; 30 percent is owned by ExxonMobil)
 Qatar Fuel Additives Co. Ltd. (QAFAC; other shareholders are OPIC Middle East Corp., International Octane Ltd. and LCY Investments Corp.)
 Qatar Petroleum International (QPI) (100 per cent Owned)
 Qatalum-  50-50 joint venture between Qatar Petroleum and Norsk Hydro
 Qatofin Company Limited (Joint venture between Qatar Petrochemical Co. (QAPCO), TotalEnergies and QatarEnergy).
 Fereej Real Estate Co. QSC - Property investment, Facilities management and PM Services

Notes

References

External links 

 QAFCO Website
 QChem Website 

Oil and gas companies of Qatar
National oil and gas companies
Energy companies established in 1974
Non-renewable resource companies established in 1974
Qatari brands
Government-owned companies of Qatar
Qatari companies established in 1974